Lorenzo Daniel (born March 23, 1966) is an American retired track and field sprinter, best known for setting the 1985 world's best year performance in the men's 200 meters and being one of the fastest to  run the event at the time. He did so on May 18, 1985, at a meet in Starkville, Mississippi, clocking 20.07. His fastest-ever 200m dash was 19.87 at Eugene, Oregon in 1988. He attended Mississippi State University, and majored in Sports Communication. Daniel was born in Avera, Georgia and grew up in Wrens, Georgia. At a time he was the third-fastest man in the world. Though he made the 1988 Olympics, he injured himself before he could attend The Games. He now resides in Dallas, Texas; has a wife, Sissy Sanders-Daniel and three children: Lauren, Lorenzo Jr., and Lorielle. He also founded and currently runs a sports agility company, Turbo Techniques.

References
 1985 Year Rankings

1966 births
Living people
American male sprinters
Mississippi State Bulldogs men's track and field athletes
People from Jefferson County, Georgia
Track and field athletes from Georgia (U.S. state)
Universiade medalists in athletics (track and field)
Universiade gold medalists for the United States
Medalists at the 1987 Summer Universiade